The Head of the Brazilian Imperial House is an informal title created by Brazilian monarchists, a position held by the leader of the former Brazilian imperial family who is currently Bertrand of Orleans-Braganza since 2022. After the death of the last emperor of Brazil, Pedro II of Brazil, in 1891, in view of the proclamation of the Brazilian republic on November 15, 1889, and the revocation of all titles of nobility then existing, starting with the Brazilian Constitution of 1891. It serves to indicate the heir presumptive to the extinct imperial throne of Brazil.

The Brazilian monarchists affirm that, maintaining the logic established by the Brazilian Constitution of 1824, this title would respect the line of sovereignty of the jus sanguinis, being granted to the oldest male direct descendant of Pedro I of Brazil and, failing that, to the varoa. If the holder of the title were a descendant of the Brazilian imperial family, as was Isabel Leopoldina de Bragança, who married Prince Gastão of Orléans in 1864, the title would never be transmitted to her husband, this being the Head Consort of the Imperial House Brazilian.

In the same way that happened with the Brazilian emperors when they were elevated to the throne, the first-born of the Head of the Brazilian Imperial House would receive the extinct title of Prince Imperial of Brazil, and his son the title of Prince of Grão-Pará.

List of Heads of the Imperial House

Vassouras line

Dynastic question 1908

In 1908, Pedro de Alcântara, then Prince Imperial of Brazil in exile, wanted to marry Countess Elisabeth Dobržensky de Dobrženicz (1875–1951), whose family had belonged to the nobility of the kingdom of Bohemia. The countess did not, however, belong to a  reigning or formerly reigning dynasty, as both Orléans and Braganza traditions expected of brides. As Prince Pedro wanted to marry with his mother's blessing, he renounced his rights to the throne of Brazil at Cannes on 30 October 1908.
If the 1908 renunciation of Pedro de Alcântara was valid, his brother Luiz (and eventually, Pedro Henrique) became next in the line of succession after their mother. Isabel's headship of the Brazilian Imperial House lasted until her death in 1921, when she is widely considered to have been succeeded by her grandson, Prince Pedro Henrique of Orléans-Braganza. Pedro Henrique was the elder son of Prince Luiz, second child of Isabel and a veteran of World War I who had died in 1920 from an illness he contracted in the trenches.

Prince Pedro de Alcântara did not dispute the validity of the renunciation. Though he did not claim the headship of the Imperial House himself, in 1937 he did say in an interview that his renunciation "did not meet the requirements of Brazilian Law, there was no prior consultation with the nation, there was none of the necessary protocol that is required for acts of this nature and, furthermore, it was not a hereditary renunciation."

The dynastic dispute over the Brazilian crown began after 1940 when Prince Pedro Gastão of Orléans-Braganza, eldest son of Pedro de Alcântara repudiated his father's renunciation and claimed the headship of the Brazilian Imperial House.

Pedro Gastão actively campaigned in support of Brazil's 1993 referendum on restoration of the Brazilian monarchy, which would have postponed for subsequent decision by Parliament of which descendant of the former imperial family should occupy the throne if monarchy had been re-instated, but the option of restoration was defeated despite garnering approximately 17 million votes. After the death of Pedro Gastão in 2007, his eldest son Prince Pedro Carlos and younger children declared themselves republicans. Several of Pedro Gastão's grandchildren also have dual citizenship.

Vassouras branch 
As the current Head of the Vassouras Bertrand Branch also has no children and has never been married, if Bertrand dies, the leadership will pass to his brother Antônio João who is married to the Belgian princess Christine de Ligne, sister of the Head of the House of Ligne Michel, currently Antônio João holds the rightful title of Prince Imperial of Brazil, as heir presumptive to his brother Bertrand. Antônio João had 4 children: Pedro Luís, Amélia Maria, Rafael Antônio and Maria Gabriela. Antônio's first son, Pedro Luis, died on Air France flight 447, and was fourth in the line of succession when he died, Antonio's second daughter, Amélia Maria, upon her marriage she was committed to resign her dynasty rights and the Brazilian princely title, although such thing is not legally allowed by Brazil's monarchical constitution without parliamentary approval, de facto was the fifth in the line of succession to the Brazilian throne until her supposed renunciation. Antonio's third son, Rafael Antônio, currently has the rightful title of Prince of Grão-Pará, Antonio's last child, Maria Gabriela, is the fourth in the line of succession to lead the Imperial House.

Currently, Eleonora de Ligne, is the fifth in line of succession to head the Imperial House of Brazil, she married the head of the House of Ligne of Belgium, Michel, Prince of Ligne, with whom she had two children: Princess Alix and Henri Antoine, Hereditary Prince of Ligne.

Petropolis branch 

For others, the person who succeeded by right to Isabel Leopoldina at the head of the imperial house was her son Pedro de Alcântara, Prince of Grão-Pará, considering the instrument of resignation signed by him null and void. After the death of Pedro de Alcântara (1940), his son Pedro Gastão (until 2007) and his grandson Pedro Carlos of Orleans-Braganza would have risen successively.

References

External links 
 Imperial House of Brazil